This article displays the rosters for the teams competing at the EuroBasket Women 1938. Each team has to submit 10 players.











References

External links
 FIBA Archive

Squads
EuroBasket Women squads